Qunxing Paper Holdings Limited is the largest decorative base paper manufacturer in the People's Republic of China, specializing in decorative base paper products and printing paper product. Its production base is located in Zouping County, Shandong Province. It serves 13 provinces, autonomous regions and municipalities in the PRC.

Qunxing Paper was listed on the Hong Kong Stock Exchange on 2 October 2007.

References

External links
Qunxing Paper Holdings Limited

Companies listed on the Hong Kong Stock Exchange
Privately held companies of China
Companies based in Shandong
Pulp and paper companies of China
Manufacturing companies established in 1999
Chinese companies established in 1999